David Afkham (born 1983) is a German conductor.

Biography
Born in Freiburg im Breisgau, Germany, Afkham began violin and piano studies at age 6.  At age 15, he studied at the Hochschule für Musik Freiburg, where he was a piano student of James Avery. In 2002, he won the  competition. In 2007, he finished his conducting studies with Nicolás Pasquet at the Hochschule für Musik "Franz Liszt" in Weimar.  One of his siblings is Micha Afkham, a violist with the Berlin Philharmonic.

In 2008, Afkham won the first prize of the Donatella Flick Conducting Competition, and subsequently became assistant conductor of the London Symphony Orchestra. From 2009 to 2012, he was assistant conductor of the Gustav Mahler Youth Orchestra.

In 2014, Afkham became principal conductor of the Orquesta Nacional de España (ONE).  In February 2019, the ONE announced the elevation of Afkham's title with the orchestra to chief conductor and artistic director of the Orquestra y Coro Nacional de España (OCNE), effective with the 2019-2020 season.  In January 2023, the OCNE announced the extension of Afkham's contract through September 2026.

Afkham has commercially recorded for such labels as Berlin Classics.

References

External links
 Official website of David Afkham

German male conductors (music)
Living people
1983 births
Hochschule für Musik Freiburg alumni
Hochschule für Musik Franz Liszt, Weimar alumni
21st-century German conductors (music)
21st-century German male musicians
Musicians from Freiburg im Breisgau